Mohammed Qassim Al-Balooshi (born November 9, 1981) is a footballer from the United Arab Emirates (UAE). He currently plays formerly spent over ten seasons with Al-Ahli in Dubai.

References

External links
 

1981 births
Living people
Emirati footballers
Association football defenders
Al Ahli Club (Dubai) players
Dibba FC players
Al Ain FC players
Al Dhafra FC players
Hatta Club players
Dibba Al-Hisn Sports Club players
2004 AFC Asian Cup players
2007 AFC Asian Cup players
United Arab Emirates international footballers
UAE First Division League players
UAE Pro League players
Footballers at the 2002 Asian Games
Asian Games competitors for the United Arab Emirates